Alludugaru or Alludu Garu  is a 1990 Indian Telugu-language drama film directed by K. Raghavendra Rao and produced by Mohan Babu under Lakshmi Prasanna Films. This film stars Mohan Babu and Shobhana in lead roles, while Ramya Krishna also appeared in an important supporting role. It was commercially and critically successful running for more than 100 days. The music of the movie was composed by K. V. Mahadevan.

This film is a remake of Malayalam blockbuster Chithram.

Cast 
 Mohan Babu as Vishnu
 Shobana as Kalyani
 Ramya Krishna as Revathi
 Jaggayya as Ramachandra Prasad
 Chandramohan as Anand
 Kaikala Satyanarayana as Jailer
 Gollapudi Maruthi Rao
 Sudhakar

Soundtrack 

Soundtrack composed by K. V. Mahadevan is owned by Aditya Music.

Awards 
 K. J. Yesudas won Nandi Award for Best Male Playback Singer for the song "Muddabanthi Navvulo".

References

External links 
 

1990 films
Films directed by K. Raghavendra Rao
Telugu remakes of Malayalam films
Films scored by K. V. Mahadevan
Indian romantic drama films
1990s Telugu-language films